The 1946 Pacific typhoon season has no official bounds; it ran year-round in 1946, but most tropical cyclones tend to form in the northwestern Pacific Ocean between June and December. These dates conventionally delimit the period of each year when most tropical cyclones form in the northwestern Pacific Ocean.

The scope of this article is limited to the Pacific Ocean, north of the equator and west of the International Date Line. Storms that form east of the date line and north of the equator are called hurricanes; see 1946 Pacific hurricane season. At the time, tropical storms that formed within this region of the western Pacific were identified and named by the United States Armed Services, and these names are taken from the list that USAS publicly adopted before the 1945 season started.

Storms

Typhoon Barbara

Typhoon Barbara formed on March 27, and moved west. It strengthened briefly to a category 3 with 115 mph winds. But shortly after, it began to weaken. Typhoon Barbara curved northward and then westward, in turn hitting the Philippines as a category 1. After making landfall, it curved back to the east and continued to weaken until April 7, when it dissipated.

Typhoon Charlotte

Charlotte formed in the open Pacific on May 11. It then dissipated on May 17.

Typhoon Dolly

On June 17, Typhoon Dolly formed. It moved northwestward, only to strengthen. After passing by the Philippines, it reached its maximum intensity of 125 mph, a strong major hurricane. It rounded around Taiwan and made landfall on China's shoreline. It dissipated hours after on June 23.

Tropical Storm Elinor

Elinor formed near Northern Luzon on June 23. However, due to the interaction with nearby Dolly, it didn't strengthened further and it dissipated on June 25.

Typhoon Ginny

Ginny formed on July 30 in the open western Pacific. It then moved to the north, weakening and dissipated on July 2. No landmasses were affected.

Early-July Typhoon

A tropical storm was first noted in weather maps on July 8, near Palau. Moving to the northwest, it strengthened to a minimal typhoon before it hit Formosa as a weakening storm. It then crossed the Formosa Strait, before making another landfall near Xiamen on July 12. It was last noted on the same day.

The damages and deaths, if any, were unknown.

Typhoon Ingrid

Tropical Storm Ingrid formed July 12, immediately moving west. After strengthening, it briefly became a category four on July 15. It weakened to a category two and struck the northern part of the Philippines. Ingrid retained its strength until it hit Hong Kong and Macau. Right after it made landfall immediately to the west of Macau, it moved north and dissipated on July 20.

Typhoon Janie

Janie formed on July 23. It moved northwest and then curved west. It was then that she became a major hurricane with 115 mph winds. After heading westward for a while, Janie began curving the opposite direction. But that was short-lived; it began moving northwest and struck southern Japan. Janie traveled over the island and dissipated near Russias coast on July 31.

Typhoon Lilly

On August 10, a disturbance managed to organize itself enough to be designated Tropical Storm Lilly. It moved in a generally northwest direction while intensifying at a moderate pace-becoming Typhoon Lilly shortly after its formation. Before Lilly moved over cold waters, it attained a peak intensity of 145 mph. It narrowly missed Japan's shoreline as a category two before striking Korea as a moderate tropical storm. Lilly dissipated on August 21, after eleven days of traveling in the western Pacific Ocean AND the end of the typhoon...

Typhoon Maggie

Early September Typhoon

Typhoon Opal
 Typhoon Opal is a Tropical Cyclone that formed in the Western Pacific in 1946. It reached category 3 status and struck The Philippines and China.

Typhoon Priscilla
 Typhoon Priscilla is a Category 3 typhoon that went out to sea during 1946.

Typhoon Querida

Across the island, Querida destroyed 373,748 houses, killed 154 people, and injured another 618. The storm also wrecked  of crops and forestry, killing 28,448 animals.

Early October Philippine Typhoon

Mid October Typhoon

Typhoon Alma

Typhoon Betty

Typhoon Dianne

Storm names

See also

 1946 Atlantic hurricane season
 List of Pacific typhoon seasons
 1900–1950 South-West Indian Ocean cyclone seasons
 1940s Australian region cyclone seasons
 1940s South Pacific cyclone seasons

References

External links 
 Unisys tracks

1946
1946 natural disasters
1946 meteorology
1946 in Asia
1946 in Oceania